{
  "type": "FeatureCollection",
  "features": [
    {
      "type": "Feature",
      "properties": {},
      "geometry": {
        "type": "LineString",
        "coordinates": [
          [
            -122.070733,
            37.908264
          ],
          [
            -122.070492,
            37.906611
          ],
          [
            -122.069154,
            37.904823
          ],
          [
            -122.067472,
            37.904335
          ],
          [
            -122.065172,
            37.905202
          ],
          [
            -122.064074,
            37.906476
          ],
          [
            -122.062392,
            37.90672
          ],
          [
            -122.06047,
            37.906503
          ],
          [
            -122.05848,
            37.90653
          ],
          [
            -122.052748,
            37.908969
          ],
          [
            -122.049487,
            37.909511
          ],
          [
            -122.046329,
            37.911543
          ],
          [
            -122.041243,
            37.915422
          ],
          [
            -122.037262,
            37.919324
          ],
          [
            -122.03431,
            37.920949
          ],
          [
            -122.02804,
            37.923449
          ],
          [
            -122.024128,
            37.924099
          ],
          [
            -122.019734,
            37.925345
          ],
          [
            -122.01541,
            37.927567
          ],
          [
            -122.004315,
            37.930137
          ],
          [
            -122.001638,
            37.933496
          ],
          [
            -121.998,
            37.936909
          ],
          [
            -121.996901,
            37.939347
          ],
          [
            -121.996901,
            37.942489
          ],
          [
            -121.995872,
            37.945035
          ],
          [
            -121.99244,
            37.947256
          ],
          [
            -121.983584,
            37.948231
          ],
          [
            -121.979029,
            37.948388
          ],
          [
            -121.96887,
            37.946222
          ],
          [
            -121.9653,
            37.946113
          ],
          [
            -121.957337,
            37.952126
          ]
        ]
      }
    },
    {
      "type": "Feature",
      "properties": {},
      "geometry": {
        "type": "LineString",
        "coordinates": [
          [
            -121.957375,
            37.95199
          ],
          [
            -121.950442,
            37.957623
          ],
          [
            -121.945843,
            37.959627
          ],
          [
            -121.941689,
            37.962871
          ],
          [
            -121.932216,
            37.962329
          ],
          [
            -121.928097,
            37.963521
          ],
          [
            -121.926175,
            37.967528
          ],
          [
            -121.918075,
            37.972835
          ],
          [
            -121.914231,
            37.974567
          ],
          [
            -121.909152,
            37.974784
          ],
          [
            -121.902287,
            37.978358
          ],
          [
            -121.899953,
            37.981606
          ],
          [
            -121.895512,
            37.990791
          ],
          [
            -121.897159,
            37.995014
          ],
          [
            -121.883431,
            38.033545
          ]
        ]
      }
    }
  ]
}Ygnacio Valley Road, is a major arterial road in central Contra Costa County, California. It extends from Interstate 680 and SR 24 in Walnut Creek to SR 4 in Pittsburg. It is signed Kirker Pass Road and then Railroad Avenue for much of the northern portion and briefly as Hillside Avenue at its southwest terminus.

The road also passes through Concord and borders Clayton.

Route 
The route begins near the Interstate 680/Highway 24 junction, at the westbound entrance to Highway 24 at Ygnacio Valley Road, although this portion is actually signed as Hillside Avenue. It then changes signage to Ygnacio Valley Road through an interchange with I-680 and continues though downtown Walnut Creek and Heather Farm Park. The road enters Concord through Lime Ridge Open Space and continues into the Clayton Valley neighborhood. After the intersection with Clayton Road, it becomes Kirker Pass Road and makes an approximately 4.5 mile-long pass over the northern Diablo Range. It then enters Pittsburg, where it becomes Railroad Avenue at the Buchanan Road intersection. From here it continues through central Pittsburg before terminating at E 3rd St near the Pittsburg Marina.

Major Intersections

References 

Roads in Contra Costa County, California